Lancaster City Museum is a museum in Lancaster, Lancashire, England. It is housed in the former Lancaster Town Hall building in Market Square.

History
The Old Town Hall building in which the museum is housed is recorded in the National Heritage List for England as a designated Grade II* listed building.  It was designed by Major Thomas Jarrett and built between 1781 and 1783, with a cupola added in 1782 to a design by Thomas Harrison. It was extended in 1871 and 1886. In 1910, the functions of the Town Hall were transferred to a new building in nearby Dalton Square. The old Town Hall was converted into a museum in 1923.

The building is a two-storey structure built from sandstone ashlar, fronted by a projecting tetrastyle Tuscan portico. The façade presents five bays with round-arched windows and, in the centre under the portico, a round-arched door at the top of a set of four steps. The cupola surmounting the building has a square base with a second octagonal stage on the side of which is a clock face. Above is a round drum surrounded by a rotunda of Ionic columns, capped by a dome. The ground floor was originally open and contained an arcade housing a market for grain and butter. The openings to the arcade were later filled with the current ground-floor windows. The building has served a number of purposes over the years; as well as housing Lancaster's Council Chamber and subsequently the City Museum, it also housed the town court (complete with lock-ups) and branches of Barclays Bank (until 1969) and the National Westminster Bank (until 1977).

Collections

The museum was founded in 1923, and its collections illustrate the archaeology and history of the city and surrounding areas. Among its highlights is the Lancaster Roman Tombstone, a memorial dating from c. 100 AD which was found locally in 2005. It depicts a Roman soldier on horseback with a decapitated opponent at his feet, and is described as "an iconic piece of Lancaster's dramatic past [giving] a crucial insight into the history of the county." The museum was also successful in acquiring the Viking-era Silverdale Hoard, discovered in the City of Lancaster district in 2011, for its collection. The collections also include the King's Own Royal Regiment Museum.

The Museums, Libraries and Archives Council granted the museum "Accredited" status; since 1 October 2011 accreditation is a responsibility of Arts Council England.

Gallery

See also

Grade II* listed buildings in Lancashire
Listed buildings in Lancaster, Lancashire
List of works by Thomas Harrison

References

External links
 Official website
King's Own Royal Regiment Museum official website

Museums established in 1923
Local museums in Lancashire
City museums in the United Kingdom
Regimental museums in England
Former seats of local government
Grade II* listed buildings in Lancashire
Thomas Harrison buildings
City and town halls in Lancashire
Museums in Lancaster, Lancashire
1923 establishments in England
Government buildings completed in 1783